Brisbane is the capital of and most populous city in the Australian state of Queensland, and the third most populous city in Australia. The Australian Bureau of Statistics estimates that the population of Greater Brisbane is 2,462,637 as of June 2018, and the South East Queensland region, centred on Brisbane, encompasses a population of more than 3.6 million. The metropolitan area extends in all directions along the floodplain of the Brisbane River Valley between Moreton Bay and the Great Dividing Range, sprawling across several of Australia's most populous local government areas (LGAs), most centrally the City of Brisbane, which is by far the most populous LGA in the nation. The demonym of Brisbane is Brisbanite.
Brisbane will be the host of the 2032 Olympics

Country of birth

The 2021 census showed that 31.7% of Brisbane's inhabitants were born overseas and 52.2% of inhabitants had at least one parent born overseas. Brisbane has the 26th largest immigrant population among world metropolitan areas. Of inhabitants born outside of Australia, the five most prevalent countries of birth were New Zealand, England, India, Mainland China and the Philippines. Brisbane has the largest New Zealand and Taiwanese-born populations of any city in Australia.

Languages

At the 2021 census, 77.3% of inhabitants spoke only English at home, with the next most common languages being Mandarin (2.5%), Vietnamese (1.1%), Punjabi (0.9%), Cantonese (0.9%) and Spanish (0.8%).

Ancestry

At the 2021 census, the most commonly nominated ancestries were: 

At the 2021 census, 3.0% of Brisbane's population identified as being Indigenous — Aboriginal Australians and Torres Strait Islanders.

Religion

At the 2021 census, the most commonly cited religious affiliation was 'No religion' (41.4%).

Brisbane's most popular religion at the 2021 census was Christianity at 44.3%, the most popular denominations of which were Catholicism (18.6%) and Anglicanism (9.7%). Brisbane's CBD is home to two cathedrals – St John's (Anglican) and St Stephen's (Catholic).

The most popular non-Christian religions at the 2021 census were Hindu (2%), Buddhist (1.9%) and Muslim (1.8%).

Historical Populations

Notes

References

Brisbane
Brisbane